State Route 44 (SR 44) is a  state highway that runs southwest-to-northeast through portions of Jones, Putnam, Greene, Taliaferro, Wilkes, and Lincoln counties in the central and east-central parts of the U.S. state of Georgia. The route connects Gray with the central portion of Lincoln County, northwest of Lincolnton.

Route description
SR 44 begins at an intersection with US 129/SR 18/SR 22 in Gray, in Jones County. At this intersection, SR 44 begins, concurrent with US 129. The two routes head north-northeast out of town. They begin to skirt along the eastern edge of Oconee National Forest. They enter the forest very briefly before skirting the eastern edge again. They have yet another brief entrance into the forest and yet again skirt along the edge. After that, they cross over Cedar Creek into Putnam County and enter the forest proper. In Resseaus Crossroads, they intersect SR 212 (Kinderhook Road). A short distance later, they cross over Murder Creek. A few miles later, they cross over Little River and leave the forest. Approximately  later, they enter Eatonton. They intersect US 441/SR 24 (Milledgeville Road). At this intersection, US 129 splits off to follow US 441/SR 24 north, while SR 44 continues to head north-northeast on Oak Street, now concurrent with US 129 Business/US 441 Business/SR 24 Business. The four routes curve to the north-northwest and pass the Uncle Remus Golf Course. They curve to the northeast before curving again to the north-northwest. At East Sumter Street, SR 16/SR 44 split off to the northeast. Next to Putnam General Hospital, the two routes diverge. About  later, SR 44 leaves town. It crosses over Lick Creek on the Tom C. Hallman Memorial Bridge. A short distance later is a bridge over the Oconee River into Greene County. To the northeast is an interchange with Interstate 20 (I-20) in Greensboro. In the main part of town, it intersects US 278/SR 12/ 15 (West Broad Street). The four highways head concurrent to the east. A few blocks later, SR 15 (Siloam Road) splits off to the southeast. Just northeast of town, they pass Greene County Regional Airport and head into Union Point. At Athens Highway, SR 44/SR 77 split off to the north-northwest and curve to the northwest. At Washington Highway, SR 44 splits off to the northeast and then curves to a mostly eastern routing. It has crossings of the South Fork Little River and North Fork Little River. The latter one marks the Greene–Taliaferro county line. A little while later, SR 44 has a second intersection with SR 22. Almost immediately, it enters Wilkes County. Just before entering Washington, it meets the western terminus of SR 44 Spur (Harris Road). In town, it passes Ranger Stadium just before intersecting US 78 Business/SR 10 Business (Lexington Avenue). About  later is US 78/SR 10 (Lexington Road). The three highways head concurrent to the east. At SR 17 Business, SR 44 splits off to the north-northeast, then turns to the east one block later. Then, it curves to the northeast and intersects SR 17 (Sam McGill Memorial Parkway). After leaving Washington, it curves its way to the northeast and crosses into Lincoln County.

The following portions of SR 44 is part of the National Highway System, a system of routes determined to be the most important for the nation's economy, mobility, and defense:
The entire length of the SR 15 concurrency in Greensboro
The entire length of the US 78/SR 10 concurrency in Washington

History

Major intersections

Bannered route

State Route 44 Spur (SR 44 Spur) is a  spur route of SR 44 that exists entirely within the central part of Wilkes County. It is known as Harris Road for its entire length.

It begins at an intersection with SR 44 mainline (Greensboro Road) southwest of Washington. It heads nearly due east until it meets its eastern terminus, an intersection with SR 47 (Sharon Road) south of the main part of town.

The only piece of SR 44 Spur that is included as part of the National Highway System, a system of roadways important to the nation's economy, defense, and mobility, is the part concurrent with US 78/SR 10 in Washington.

See also

 List of state routes in Georgia (U.S. state)
 List of highways numbered 44

References

External links

044
Transportation in Jones County, Georgia
Transportation in Putnam County, Georgia
Transportation in Greene County, Georgia
Transportation in Taliaferro County, Georgia
Transportation in Wilkes County, Georgia
Transportation in Lincoln County, Georgia